Eduardo Schwank and Mariano Hood were the defending champions, but they chose to not participate this year.
Horacio Zeballos and Sebastián Prieto won in the final 7–6(2), 6–2, against Flávio Saretta and Rogério Dutra da Silva.

Seeds

Draw

Draw

External links
 Doubles Draw

Challenger de Providencia - Copa Cachantun - Doubles
2009 - Doubles